Alexandr Dolgopolov decided not to defend his 2009 title.Jaroslav Pospíšil won the final against Yuri Schukin 6–4, 4–6, 6–3.

Seeds

Draw

Finals

Top half

Bottom half

References
Main Draw
Qualifying Singles

ATP Challenger Trophy - Singles
2010 Singles